John Hack (born 29 May 1959) is a former motorcycle speedway rider in National League (speedway) and British League.

Career
John Hack was an outstanding Cycle Speedway rider with Blackley, a team in Manchester, 1973-1976. His honours included a place in the 1975 British Senior Chanmpionship semi-final and a place in the 1976 British Junior Championship final. He was Blackley's top scorer in their 1975 winning British Junior Team Championship. 
Taking up Speedway with Stoke Potters in National League in October 1976, he was signed for British League side Cradley Heathens in 1977, having made a positive impression while attending their training school. He started with second-half rides on a two-valve bike before buying a Weslake and soon making his National League debut for Glasgow Tigers (speedway) away at Canterbury in September 1977. As the 1977 season ended, he was awarded the Ivor Hughes Trophy as Cradley's most promising junior.
In 1978, John Hack transferred to Oxford Cheetahs and quickly achieved a position as a Heat Leader - taking seven consecutive 5-1s partnering another newcomer to the team, David Shields. 
He was a competent middle-rank rider for his clubs with a promising career as he showed the potential to reach the higher ranks. Time out in 1979 after breaking an ankle. 
Gave up racing after a life-threatening accident at Monmore Green stadium Wolverhampton put him in a coma for two weeks. Arthur Browning (speedway rider) had lost control of his bike on a greasy track, with his machine colliding with John and sending him crashing into a lamppost (a similar incident had seen the death of Gary Peterson (speedway rider) here in 1975, also during a match against Oxford). The injuries John suffered included a fractured skull, broken ribs and a broken leg and for a time he was not expected to survive. He still suffers certain effects from the accident currently.

After speedway
Worked in the family's greengrocery business then at Remploy for 23 years. No longer has any involvement with speedway. Has a daughter, Gemma, and a son, Daniel.

References

External links
 https://wwosbackup.proboards.com/thread/1256
 http://www.cradleyspeedway.co.uk/riders/johnhack.htm 
 https://www.oxfordmail.co.uk/sport/8302237.speedway-cheetahs-riders-meet/
 https://reader.exacteditions.com/issues/72472/page/27

1959 births
Living people
English motorcycle racers
British speedway riders
Oxford Cheetahs riders
Cradley Heathens riders